Campbell County is a county located in the northern part of the U.S. state of Kentucky. As of the 2020 census, the population was 93,076. Its county seats are Alexandria and Newport. The county was formed on December 17, 1794, from sections of Scott, Harrison, and Mason Counties and was named for Colonel John Campbell (1735–1799), a Revolutionary War soldier and Kentucky legislator.
Campbell County, with Boone and Kenton Counties, is part of the Northern Kentucky metro community, and the Cincinnati-Middletown, OH-KY-IN Metropolitan Statistical Area.

History
Campbell County was founded December 17, 1794, two years after the creation of the Commonwealth of Kentucky, becoming the state's 19th county. Campbell County was carved out of Scott, Harrison and Mason counties. The original county included all of present Boone, Kenton, Pendleton, and most of Bracken and Grant counties. Campbell County is named in honor of John Campbell, an Irish immigrant who was a soldier, explorer, statesman and one of the drafters of the Kentucky Constitution.

The first courthouse, built of logs, was replaced in 1815 by a brick structure. The present courthouse dates from 1884.

County seat
Wilmington, a pioneer settlement, was the original county seat of Campbell County from 1794 until 1797. The original justices in the Campbell County Court were John Roberts, Thomas Kennedy, Samuel Bryan, John Cook, James Little, Robert Benham and John Bush. Newport was designated as the county seat until 1823, when it was moved to Visalia, at that time closer to the geographical center of the county. This was an unpopular action, however, as the overwhelming majority of residents lived in the north, along the Ohio River. The county court returned to Newport in 1824 and remained there until 1840.

In 1840, Kenton County was created, primarily out of a significant portion of Campbell. The Kentucky General Assembly forced the county to move its seat to Alexandria, closer to the center of the new, smaller Campbell County. In 1883, after years of lobbying, the General Assembly established a special provision to allow Newport to designate a Court House District separate from the offices in Alexandria.

The special Courthouse Commission legislation led to the misconception that the county was dual seated, but Alexandria remained the sole de jure county seat. It was not until November 24, 2010, that a court ruling granted Newport equal status as a county seat.

Geography
It is the fourth-smallest county in Kentucky by land area and fifth-smallest by total area. It lies along the Ohio and Licking Rivers.

Adjacent counties
 Hamilton County, Ohio (north)
 Clermont County, Ohio (east)
 Pendleton County (south)
 Kenton County (west)

Major highways

Demographics

As of the census of 2000, there were 88,616 people, 34,742 households, and 23,103 families residing in the county. The racial makeup of the county was 96.64% White, 1.57% Black or African American, 0.17% Native American, 0.54% Asian, 0.01% Pacific Islander, 0.31% from other races, and 0.76% from two or more races.  0.86% of the population were Hispanics or Latinos of any race. This number has decreased to about 0.2% based on a 2006 Census Estimate by the United States Census Bureau.

There were 34,742 households, out of which 32.50% had children under the age of 18 living with them, 50.30% were married couples living together, 12.30% had a female householder with no husband present, and 33.50% were non-families. 28.60% of all households were made up of individuals, and 9.90% had someone living alone who was 65 years of age or older.  The average household size was 2.49 and the average family size was 3.09.

The age distribution was 25.60% under 18, 9.80% from 18 to 24, 30.60% from 25 to 44, 21.30% from 45 to 64, and 12.60% who were 65 or older.  The median age was 35 years. For every 100 females there were 93.20 males.  For every 100 females age 18 and over, there were 89.10 males.

The median income for a household in the county was $41,903, and the median income for a family was $51,481. Males had a median income of $37,931 versus $27,646 for females. The per capita income for the county was $20,637.  About 7.30% of families and 9.30% of the population were below the poverty line, including 12.20% of those under age 18 and 7.90% of those age 65 or over.

Education
There are six school districts in Campbell County. 
 Bellevue Independent Schools, Bellevue
 Campbell County Schools, Alexandria
 Dayton Independent Schools, Dayton
 Fort Thomas Independent Schools, Fort Thomas
 Newport Independent Schools, Newport
 Southgate Independent School District has but one PreK-8th school in it.
 former
 Silver Grove Independent Schools, Silver Grove - merged with the Campbell County district on July 1, 2019.

Northern Kentucky University located in Highland Heights provides the area with access to higher education.

Public high schools
Students in the county attend one of 6 public and 2 parochial high schools.

Private high schools
 Roman Catholic Diocese of Covington
 Bishop Brossart High School, Alexandria
 Newport Central Catholic High School, Newport

Communities

Cities

 Alexandria (county seat)
 Bellevue
 California
 Camp Springs
 Cold Spring
 Crestview
 Dayton
 Fort Thomas
 Highland Heights
 Melbourne
 Mentor
 Newport (county seat)
 Silver Grove
 Southgate
 Wilder
 Woodlawn

Census-designated place
 Claryville

Other unincorporated places
 Brayville
 Oneonta - probably named after Oneonta, New York. Located midway between Ross and California, the settlement was conveniently located beside the Ohio River as a docking place for ferrying people and supplies especially from New Richmond, Ohio (once the largest and most flourishing village in Clermont County) toward Alexandria, Kentucky.

Politics
Politically, Campbell County is very Republican. In presidential elections it has only voted Democratic once since 1948.

See also

 National Register of Historic Places listings in Campbell County, Kentucky

References

External links
 Campbell County government's website
  Campbell County Public Library
 Campbell County Search & Rescue
 Historical Images and Texts of Campbell County

 
1794 establishments in Kentucky
Kentucky counties
Kentucky counties on the Ohio River
Populated places established in 1794